The Order of Beneficence is an order of Greece that was established in 1948. 

It is conferred by the Greek government as a moral reward for women especially, Greek and foreign, for the good services they have rendered to the Fatherland in the field of charity as well as for their performance in the arts and letters. The fact that the order is awarded to women does  mean that the other Greek decorations are awarded exclusively to men.

Grades
The Order has five classes:
Grand Cross - wears the badge on a sash from the right shoulder, plus the star on the left chest;
Grand Commander - wears the badge on a bow, plus the star on the right chest;
Commander - wears the badge on a bow;
Gold Cross - wears the badge on a ribbon on the left chest;
Silver Cross - wears the badge on a ribbon on the left chest.

Insignia
The badge of the Order is a five tipped blue-enamelled flower, in silver for the Silver Cross class, in gold for the higher classes. The overall design is clearly derived from the then-recently abolished British Order of the Indian Empire. The obverse central disc bears a portrait of the Theotokos with the Divine Child in Her arms with the legend "ΕΥΠΟΙΙΑ" («Beneficence») on a white enamel ring. The reverse side bears the emblem of the Hellenic Republic.

The star of the Order is a silver eight-pointed star with straight rays, with the same central disc as the obverse of the badge, while the reverse side also bears the emblem of the Hellenic Republic. 

The ribbon of the Order is orange with blue edges.

See also
 Orders, decorations, and medals of Greece
 Orders of chivalry for women
 List of awards honoring women

Further reading
 George J. Beldecos, "Hellenic Orders, Decorations and Medals", pub. Hellenic War Museum, Athens 1991, .

External links
 Presidency of the Hellenic Republic - Order of Beneficence 
 The Greek Royal Orders

Beneficence (Greece), Order of
Beneficence (Greece), Order of
Awards established in 1948
Order of Beneficence (Greece)
1948 establishments in Greece
Beneficence (Greece), Order of